Cublize is a commune in the Rhône department in eastern France.

Population
In 2019, the municipality had 1,266 inhabitants.

See also
Communes of the Rhône department

References

Communes of Rhône (department)
Beaujolais (province)